Luigi Sannino (born 1981) is an Italian amateur astronomer. He is credited by the Minor Planet Center with the discovery of two asteroids in collaboration with Paolo Pietrapiana at the Monte Viseggi Observatory.

Sannino discovered (69565) 1998 AZ4 at age 18, making him the youngest asteroid discoverer in the world as of 2017.

References 

Discoverers of minor planets
Discoverers of asteroids